IWGP may refer to the following:
 the manga series Ikebukuro West Gate Park
 the International Wrestling Grand Prix, the governing body of professional wrestling promotion New Japan Pro Wrestling
 the International Work Group for Palaeoethnobotany